This is a list of the busiest airports in Chile by passenger and cargo traffic.

In graph

2022 
Source: Civil Aeronautics Board of Chile (Junta de Aeronáutica Civil), 2022.

Total passengers 2022 (JAN-DEC)

2021 
Source: Civil Aeronautics Board of Chile (Junta de Aeronáutica Civil), 2021.

Total passengers 2021

2020 
Source: Civil Aeronautics Board of Chile (Junta de Aeronáutica Civil), 2020.

Total passengers 2020

2019 
Source: Civil Aeronautics Board of Chile (Junta de Aeronáutica Civil), 2019.

Total passengers 2019

2018 
Source: Civil Aeronautics Board of Chile (Junta de Aeronáutica Civil), 2018.

Total passengers 2018

2017 
Source: Civil Aeronautics Board of Chile (Junta de Aeronáutica Civil), 2017.

Total passengers 2017

2016 
Source: Civil Aeronautics Board of Chile (Junta de Aeronáutica Civil), 2016.

Total passengers 2016

2015 
Source: Civil Aeronautics Board of Chile (Junta de Aeronáutica Civil), 2015.

Total passengers 2015

2014 
Source: Civil Aeronautics Board of Chile (Junta de Aeronáutica Civil), 2014.

Total passengers 2014

2013 
Source: Civil Aeronautics Board of Chile (Junta de Aeronáutica Civil), 2013.

Total passengers 2013

References 
http://www.transferpuertovaras.com/

Busiest
Busiest Airports
Chile